Second North River is a Canadian Community, located in Westmorland County, New Brunswick. The Community is situated in southeastern New Brunswick, to the West of Moncton.  Second North River is part of Greater Moncton.  This community is built around the Route 112 and Route 880.

History

Notable people

See also
List of communities in New Brunswick

References

Bordering communities

Steeves Mountain, New Brunswick
Salisbury, New Brunswick
Monteagle, New Brunswick
Moncton, New Brunswick
Pacific Junction, New Brunswick
Lewis Mountain, New Brunswick
Wheaton Settlement, New Brunswick
River Glade, New Brunswick

Communities in Westmorland County, New Brunswick